Aert Schouman or Aart Schouman (4 March 1710 – 5 July 1792) was an 18th-century painter, now better known as a glass engraver, from the Dutch Republic.

Schouman was born in Dordrecht.  When 15 years old he served as apprentice to the Dordrecht artist Adriaan van der Burg, along with Cornelis Greenwood, the son of his teacher for glass engraving, Frans Greenwood, inventor of the stipple style, which Schouman also worked in.  Schouman was unusual among painters in that he kept a detailed diary of his professional life from 16 October 1733 to 16 November 1753. He took on his first art pupil in 1733 and continued teaching for the rest of his life. From 1742 until 1792 he was head of the Dordrecht Guild of St. Luke, and in 1751 he became regent of the Hague drawing school associated with the Confrerie Pictura of The Hague. In 1736 he founded the "Brotherhood" of the Confrerie in The Hague, a fraternity of amateur art lovers from Dordrecht and environs, of which he was headman during the years 1752–1762.

Schouman was a leading artist in Zeeland between 1735 and 1785. During that period he lived and worked in Dordrecht, The Hague and Middelburg and taught pupils in Dordrecht and The Hague. He travelled to England twice and assembled an important collection of paintings. He was a prolific and versatile Dutch painter, glass engraver, printmaker, collector and dealer, who produced still lifes, biblical and mythological themes, natural history studies, genre, historical and topographical works, portraits, sketches, etchings and mezzotints. He designed tapestries, painted wall-hangings and decorated objects such as fans, snuffboxes and even the glass windows of a magic lantern. His pupils were Wouter Dam, Jabes Heenck, Dirk Kuipers, Pieter Willem van Megen, Nicolaes Muys, Jan van Os
Joris Ponse, Martinus Schouman (his grandnephew), Jan Willem Snoek, Rutger Moens Taats, Wouter Uiterlimmige, Wilhelmus Vincentius, Jacobus Vonck, and Daniël Vrijdag. He died in The Hague, aged 82.

References

Aert Schouman on artnet

Bibliography
Laurens J. Bol Aert Schouman. Dordrecht 1710-1792 's-Gravenhage. Tentoonstelling bijeengebracht uit openbaar en particulier bezit van tekeningen, aquarellen en prenten, Rijksprentenkabinet Rijksmuseum Amsterdam 1961
Meile D. Haga La Voliere Imaginaire. Aquarelles d'oiseaux par Aert Schouman (1710-17920), Paris, 1982

Laurens J. Bol Aart Schouman. Ingenious painter and draughtsman, Doornspijk, 1991  

1710 births
1792 deaths
18th-century Dutch painters
18th-century Dutch male artists
Dutch male painters
Artists from Dordrecht
Glass engravers
Painters from Dordrecht
Painters from The Hague
Dutch glass artists